Apology Against Rufinus is a work in three books by the Church father Saint Jerome, addressed to Pammachius and Marcella from Bethlehem, AD 402.

References

Christian apologetic works
Jerome